Kim Addonizio (July 31, 1954) is an American poet and novelist.

Life
Addonizio was born in Washington, D.C., United States. She is the daughter of tennis champion Pauline Betz and sports writer Bob Addie (born Addonizio).

She briefly attended Georgetown University and American University before dropping out of both. She later moved to San Francisco and received a B.A. and M.A. from San Francisco State University. She has taught at San Francisco State University and Goddard College.

She has a daughter, actress Aya Cash, and currently lives in Oakland, California.

Awards

 two National Endowment for the Arts fellowships
 2005 Guggenheim Fellowship
 2004 Mississippi Review Fiction Prize
 2000 National Book Award Finalist for Tell Me
 2000 Pushcart Prize for "Aliens"
 1994 San Francisco Commonwealth Club Poetry Medal

Works

Poetry

 
"What Do Women Want", poets.org
"Eating Together", Poetry, June 2003
"Scary Movies", Poetry, March 2000
"The First Line is the Deepest", Poetry, January 2009
"Weaponry", Poetry, February 2009
"Lucifer at the Starlite", Three Penny Review, Summer 2007

Fiction

Non-fiction

Anthologies

References

External links
 Addonizio's official web site
 Kim Addonizio's poet page at The Poetry Foundation
 Kim Addonizio: Profile and Poems at Poets.org
 The Palace of Illusions, a short story at Narrative Magazine.
 "Poem for the New Year"
 Kim Addonizio on creativity and the creative process, an interview with about-creativity.com July 26, 2007
 Audio: Kim Addonizio performing "Fuck" on the Indiefeed Performance Poetry Podcast
 Audio: Kim Addonizio reads "Muse" from the book What Is This Thing Called Love
 Audio: Kim Addonizio reads "You Were" from the book Lucifer at the Starlite

1954 births
American women poets
American women novelists
Living people
Georgetown University alumni
San Francisco State University alumni
Poets from Maryland
21st-century American novelists
21st-century American women writers
21st-century American poets
20th-century American poets
20th-century American women writers
Poets from Washington, D.C.
San Francisco State University faculty
Goddard College faculty
National Endowment for the Arts Fellows
Novelists from Maryland
Novelists from Vermont
American women academics